Burtsevo is a rural locality (a village) in Spasskoye Rural Settlement, Vologodsky District, Vologda Oblast, Russia. The population was 15 as of 2002. There are 23 streets.

Geography 
Burtsevo is located 6 km south of Vologda (the district's administrative centre) by road. Byvalovo is the nearest rural locality.

References 

Rural localities in Vologodsky District